MacArthur's shrew (Crocidura macarthuri) is a species of mammal in the family Soricidae. It is found in Kenya and Somalia. Its natural habitat is dry savanna.

References
 Hutterer, R. & Oguge, N. 2004.  Crocidura macarthuri.   2006 IUCN Red List of Threatened Species.   Downloaded on 30 July 2007.

MacArthur's shrew
Mammals of Kenya
Mammals of Somalia
MacArthur's shrew
Taxonomy articles created by Polbot